DXDD (657 AM) Radyo Kampana is a radio station owned and operated by Dan-ag sa Dakbayan Broadcasting Network, the media arm of the Archdiocese of Ozamiz. The station's studio is located at the 3rd Flr., New DXDD Bldg., Rizal Ave., Ozamiz, and its transmitter is located at St. Joseph Compound, Brgy. Tinago, Ozamiz.

References

Radio stations in Misamis Occidental
News and talk radio stations in the Philippines
Radio stations established in 1970